Thrissur Zoological Park Wildlife Conservation & Research Centre is an upcoming zoological park situated near Puthur,near Ollur,in Thrissur City of Kerala State in India. All zoos in the state of Kerala is presently managed by the Ministry of Cultural Affairs and this will be the first zoo in the state which will be developed and managed by the Department of Forests and Wildlife (Kerala).

History
The 13-acre Thrissur Zoo plot in the heart of the City of Thrissur where the zoo is currently located has been found unsuitable. Space constraints are affecting animals. Due to unavailability of Revenue Land, the zoo is being relocated to a 336-acre forest land in Puthur. Thereby, the management of the Zoo will be handed over to Department of Forests and Wildlife (Kerala) and it will not attract the stringent provisions of the Forest Conservation Act, 1980. The zoological park was announced for Thrissur in 2003 by the then Kerala Forest Minister K. Sudhakaran. The project will come up in the 150  acres of forest land near Puthur. The zoological park is designed by Jon Coe, a leading international zoo designer from Australia. The zoo is coming up on 336 acres at Puthur at the estimated cost of Rs 130 crore.

Plan
The zoological park and park will be constructed in three phases. The Government of Kerala has released Rs 5 crore for the first phase of the zoological park in 2013 and would cost Rs 150 crores when it is completed in three years. The funds will be provided by the Central Government. In the first stage, ticket counter, construction of wall, sideways, canteen and enclosures to house animals will be constructed. The enclosures will be in 10 acres. Shifting of animals from Thrissur Zoo will be done after the enclosures are done. In second phase, staff quarters and other facilities will be constructed. The total construction costs of the zoo may cost between Rs 300 to Rs 350 crores.

See also
Thrissur
Thrissur District

References

Zoos in Kerala
Parks in Thrissur
Tourist attractions in Thrissur